The Elaphebolia (Έλαφηβόλια Elaphēbolia) was an ancient Greek festival held at Athens and Phocis during the month of Elaphebolion (March/April dedicated to Artemis Elaphebolos (deer slayer). In the town of Hyampolis in Phocis, it would have been instituted by the inhabitants to commemorate a victory against the Thessalians.

Cakes made from flour, honey, and sesame and in the shape of stags were offered to the goddess during the festival.

Modern followers of Hellenism (religion) observe Elaphebolia as a holiday. It falls on the 6th day of the month of Elaphebolion. In 2020 it will fall on March 1.

See also
 Athenian festivals

References

Sources
Dictionary of Greek and Roman Antiquities edited by William Smith (1870) p.450 

Festivals in ancient Greece
Festivals in ancient Athens
Festivals of Artemis
Military history of ancient Thessaly
March observances
April observances